Study Original Soundtrack is the soundtrack album to the 2012 film, Study. It was released on iTunes on October 1, 2013.
The soundtrack uses a variety of musical genres including hard rock, psychedelic rock, new age, funk rock, gothic rock and thrash metal. The original score was composed by Paolo Benetazzo, Roberto Chemello and Jean Charles Carbone.

The soundtrack includes famous pieces of classical music reinterpreted for the film, such as Liszt's Un Sospiro, Chopin's Funeral March and Nocturne in E minor, Op. posth. 72, and Debussy's Arabesque No. 1.

According to the film's director, Paolo Benetazzo, "Music plays a crucial part in Study. The film does not rely on traditional techniques of narrative cinema. I wanted the film to be a primarily visual and sound experience in which music plays a vital role in evoking specific atmospheres."

Track listing

Additional music 
These classical pieces are used in the film, but are not included on the soundtrack album.

 Piano Concerto No. 2 (1st movement) - Franz Liszt
 L’usignuolo - Ottorino Respighi
 Prélude à l'après-midi d'un faune - Claude Debussy
 Prelude to Act 1 Lohengrin - Richard Wagner

References

External links 
Official soundtrack website
 

2012 soundtrack albums
Thriller film soundtracks